Actinemys pallida, the southwestern pond turtle, is an aquatic turtle of the genus Actinemys in the family Emydidae. It can be found in bodies of water in southern California and Baja California.

References 

pallida
Turtles of North America
Fauna of California

Reptiles described in 1945